Edward Baker Lincoln (March 10, 1846 – February 1, 1850) was the second son of Abraham Lincoln and Mary Todd Lincoln. He was named after Lincoln's close friend, Edward Dickinson Baker. Both Abraham and Mary spelled his name "Eddy"; however, the National Park Service uses "Eddie" as a nickname and the nickname also appears spelled this way on his crypt at the Lincoln tomb.

Early life
Eddie Lincoln was born on March 10, 1846, at the Lincoln Home in Springfield, Illinois. Little is known about his life, but a surviving story says that one day during a visit to her father Robert Todd's home in Lexington, Kentucky, Eddie's older brother, Robert found a kitten and brought it to the house. Mary Lincoln wrote to her husband about the incident: "[As] soon as Eddy, spied [the kitten], his tenderness, broke forth, he made them bring it water, fed it with bread himself, with his own dear hands, he was a delighted little creature over it." Mary's stepmother, who did not like cats, ordered the cat thrown out, "Ed screaming & protesting loudly against the proceeding, she never appeared to mind his screams, which were long & loud, I assure you."

Abraham Lincoln also referenced him in an 1848 letter to his wife, also during the aforementioned time period. He mimicks the way two-year-old Eddie would say his father had gone to the Capitol: "Dear Eddy thinks father is 'gone tapila.'" He also writes about searching for plaid stockings that would "fit Eddy's dear little feet," but says ultimately that he had been unsuccessful, and finally closes his letter with, "What did he and Eddy think of the little letters father sent them? Dont [sic] let the blessed fellows forget father…."

Death
Eddie died a month before his fourth birthday. Census records list "chronic consumption" (tuberculosis) as the cause. An alternate theory is that he died of medullary thyroid cancer given that: (a) "consumption" was a term then applied to many wasting diseases, (b) cancer is a wasting disease, (c) Abraham and two of Eddie's brothers had several features compatible with the genetic cancer syndrome multiple endocrine neoplasia type 2b (MEN2B), and (d) his thick, asymmetric lower lip is a sign of MEN2B. The familial MEN2B theory regarding the Lincolns, however, is principally challenged by the fact that Abraham Lincoln himself lived to be fifty-six, the untreated disease usually resulting in death sometime in the victim's thirties; most researchers subscribe to the idea that Eddie's death was caused by tuberculosis.

Abraham Lincoln referenced Eddie's death in a letter to his stepbrother John D. Johnston, noting that Eddie was "sick fifty-two days," and "We miss him very much."

Eddie's funeral was held at the Lincoln's home by the pastor of the First Presbyterian Church, and his body was buried at the nearby Hutchinson's Cemetery in Springfield, Illinois. Both parents were devastated.  A week after his death, an unsigned poem entitled "Little Eddie" was printed in the Illinois Daily Journal.

Authorship of the poem was long a mystery with some supposing that Abraham and Mary wrote it. In 2012, the Abraham Lincoln Association published an article in their journal that concludes neither of them did so, and that it was instead an early draft by a young poet from St. Louis. The final line is on Eddie's original gravestone, which now resides in the Abraham Lincoln Presidential Museum in Springfield.

Abraham and Mary's next child, Willie Lincoln, was born ten months after Eddie's death. After Abraham's assassination, Eddie's remains were transferred to the Lincoln Tomb at Oak Ridge Cemetery in Springfield.

See also
Lincoln family tree

References

Books

External links
 Edward Baker Lincoln biography with photo
Edward "Eddie" Baker Lincoln via Lincoln Family Home National Historic Site

1846 births
1850 deaths
19th-century deaths from tuberculosis
Tuberculosis deaths in Illinois
Lincoln family
Children of presidents of the United States
People from Springfield, Illinois
Burials at Oak Ridge Cemetery
Child deaths